Dmitry Yevgenyevich Aleksandriysky (born 13 August 1968) is a Russian professional association football coach and a former player.

External links
 

1968 births
Living people
Soviet footballers
Russian footballers
Association football defenders
Russian football managers
FC Spartak Kostroma players